Maximilien-Gabriel Mayunga (born 28 October 1934) is a former football striker and manager who played professionally in Belgium.

Career
Mayunga began playing football in his home town of Léopoldville (now Kinshasa), and after participating in a friendly match between Belgian First Division side Royale Union Saint-Gilloise and a Léopoldville selection, he was signed by local side Daring Club Léopoldville before moving to Belgium to join Daring Club Brussels.  Mayunga appeared in 150 matches and scored 35 goals for Daring Club from 1959 to 1966, when he was recalled to Congo-Kinshasa. Upon his return to Kinshasa, Mayunga became the manager of Daring Club.

References

1934 births
Living people
Democratic Republic of the Congo footballers
Daring Club Motema Pembe players
R. Daring Club Molenbeek players
Association football forwards
21st-century Democratic Republic of the Congo people